Sir Paul Mason  (11 June 1904 – 14 May 1978) was a British diplomat, ambassador to the Netherlands from 1954 to 1960 and the British Permanent Representative to the North Atlantic Council from 1960 to 1962.

The son of Arthur James Mason, he was educated at Eton and King's College, Cambridge, taking a first class honours degree in Modern History in 1926.

Joining the Foreign Service in 1928, Mason had overseas postings to Brussels, Sofia, Prague, Ottawa, and Lisbon and also home posts at the Foreign Office in London. He was assistant private secretary to the Foreign Secretary, 1934–1936, then private secretary to the Parliamentary Under Secretary of State, 1936–37. He was an acting Counsellor in 1945, then British Minister at Sofia, 1949–1951, before being recalled to London as assistant Under Secretary of State at the Foreign Office from 1951 to 1954.  He was British Ambassador to the Netherlands, 1954–1960, then Permanent Representative on the North Atlantic Council, 1960–1962 and an Alternate Delegate to the Minister of State in the Geneva Delegation on Disarmament and Nuclear Tests, 1962–1964.

In retirement, Mason was High Sheriff of Nottinghamshire for 1970 and Treasurer of the University of Nottingham from 1972 until his death.

In 1938 he married Roberta, daughter J. Lorn McDougall KC, of Ottawa, and they had one son and one daughter. At the time of his death his address was Morton Hall, Retford, Nottinghamshire, the family seat. He was a member of the Lansdowne Club.

Honours
Chevalier of the Order of Leopold
Grand Cordon of the Order of the House of Orange, 1958

References

1904 births
1978 deaths
Alumni of King's College, Cambridge
People educated at Eton College
Ambassadors of the United Kingdom to the Netherlands
High Sheriffs of Nottinghamshire
Knights Commander of the Order of St Michael and St George
Knights Commander of the Royal Victorian Order
Permanent Representatives of the United Kingdom to NATO